John Gill (23 November 1697 – 14 October 1771) was an English Baptist pastor, biblical scholar, and theologian who held to a firm Calvinistic soteriology. Born in Kettering, Northamptonshire, he attended Kettering Grammar School where he mastered the Latin classics and learned Greek by age 11. He continued self-study in everything from logic to Hebrew, his love for the latter remaining throughout his life.

Early life and education

At the age of about 12, Gill heard a sermon from his pastor, William Wallis, on the text, "And the  God called unto Adam, and said unto him, Where art thou?". The message stayed with Gill and eventually led to his conversion. It was not until seven years later that he made a public profession of faith.

Pastoral work
His first pastoral work was as an intern assisting John Davis at Higham Ferrers in 1718 at age 21. He became pastor at the Strict Baptist church at Goat Yard Chapel, Horsleydown, Southwark in 1719. His pastorate lasted 51 years. In 1757 his congregation needed larger premises and moved to a Carter Lane, St. Olave's Street, Southwark. This Baptist church was once pastored by Benjamin Keach and would later become the New Park Street Chapel and then the Metropolitan Tabernacle pastored by Charles Spurgeon.

During Gill's ministry, the church strongly supported the preaching of George Whitefield at nearby Kennington Common.

Various works
In 1748, Gill was awarded the honorary degree of Doctor of Divinity by the University of Aberdeen. He was a profound scholar and a prolific author. His most important works are:
 The Doctrine of the Trinity Stated and Vindicated (London, 1731)
 The Cause of God and Truth (4 parts, 1735–38), a retort to Daniel Whitby's Five Points
 An Exposition of the New Testament (3 vols., 1746–48), which with his Exposition of the Old Testament (6 vols., 1748–63) forms his magnum opus
 A Collection of Sermons and Tracts
 A Dissertation Concerning the Antiquity of the Hebrew Language, Letters, Vowel-Points, and Accents (1767)
 A Body of Doctrinal Divinity (1767)
 A Body of Practical Divinity (1770).

Gill also edited and re-published the works of the antinomian theologian Tobias Crisp.

Significance
John Gill was the first major writing Baptist theologian, his work retaining influence into the 21st century. Gill's relationship with hyper-Calvinism in English Baptist life is a matter of debate. Peter Toon has argued that Gill was himself a hyper-Calvinist, which would make Gill the father of Baptist hyper-Calvinism. However, Tom Nettles and Timothy George have argued that Gill was not a hyper-Calvinist.  Gill's works are still highly regarded by Primitive Baptists and related groups.

See also
  Hyper-Calvinism
  Primitive Baptist

References

Sources
 Daniel, Curt. Hyper-Calvinism and John Gill. Unpublished Ph.D. dissertation, University of Edinburgh, 1983.
 Ella, George (1995). John Gill and the Cause of God and Truth. Eggleston, England: Go-Publications.
  First published by Baptist Quarterly, October, 1995.
 
 Murray, Iain H. Spurgeon v. Hyper-Calvinism: The Battle for Gospel Preaching. Banner of Truth, 2000. 
 
 Oliver, Robert W. History of the English Calvinistic Baptists: 1771–1892. Banner of Truth, 2006. 
 Peter Toon, The Emergence of Hyper-Calvinism in English Nonconformity, 1689-1765. London: The Olive Tree, 1967.
 Rippon, John (1838). Brief Memoir of the Life and Writings of the Reverend John Gill. Reprint: Hess Publications, 1998.

External links

 The Cause of God and Truth by John Gill (1738)
 The Emergence of Hyper-Calvinism in English Nonconformity, 1689–1765 by Peter Toon.
  The Emergence of Hyper-Calvinism in English Nonconformity, 1689–1765 by Peter Toon (1967)
  John Gill's Exposition of the Old and New Testaments—his magnum opus
  The John Gill Archive—containing most of Gill's published works, including many sermons and tracts, The Cause of God and Truth, A Body of Doctrinal Divinity, and A Body of Practical Divinity, and Solomon's Song.
  Christ alone exalted, in the perfection and encouragement of the saints, notwithstanding sins and trials : being the complete works of Tobias Crisp ... containing fifty-two sermons, on several select texts of Scripture ... Volume 1 of 2. (1832, 7th ed.)  John Gill edition.  Downloadable PDF which may be read online.
  Christ alone exalted, in the perfection and encouragement of the saints, notwithstanding sins and trials : being the complete works of Tobias Crisp ... containing fifty-two sermons, on several select texts of Scripture ... Volume 2 of 2. (1832, 7th ed.)  John Gill edition.  Downloadable PDF which may be read online.

1697 births
1771 deaths
18th-century Calvinist and Reformed theologians
18th-century Christian biblical scholars
18th-century English Baptist ministers
Baptist biblical scholars
Baptist writers
Bible commentators
Burials at Bunhill Fields
Calvinist and Reformed biblical scholars
Calvinist and Reformed writers
Christian Hebraists
Christian soteriologists
English Baptist theologians
English biblical scholars
English Calvinist and Reformed theologians
English male non-fiction writers
Hyper-Calvinism
People from Kettering